General Aguinaldo may refer to:

Baldomero Aguinaldo (1869–1915), Philippine Revolutionary Army general
Críspulo Aguinaldo (1863–1897), Philippine Revolutionary Army lieutenant general
Emilio Aguinaldo (1869–1964), Philippine Revolutionary Army general